Irree Magh was a militant Manx nationalist group. In 1975 it distributed leaflets calling for the expulsion of "come-overs" (Manx term for immigrants) and Manx Independence. The group called for "open rebellion in order to preserve our nation, heritage and country (or what's left of it)".

See also
Fo Halloo, another Manx militant organisation
Ny Troor Tromode
FSFO

References

Celtic nationalism
Separatism in the Isle of Man
Secessionist organizations in Europe
Manx nationalist parties
Manx words and phrases
1970s in the Isle of Man